The 2012 Spanish Athletics Championships was the 92nd edition of the national championship in outdoor track and field for Spain. It was held on 25 and 26 August at the Estadio Larrabide in Pamplona, Navarra. It did not serve as a national selection meeting that year, as it took place after the 2012 Summer Olympics. A total of 564 athletes (305 men and 259 women) from 102 clubs competed at the event.

The club championships in relays and combined track and field events were contested separately from the main competition.

Results

Men

Women

Medallero

References

Results
XCII Campeonato de España Absoluto . Royal Spanish Athletics Federation. Retrieved 2019-07-06.

External links 
 Official website of the Royal Spanish Athletics Federation 

2012
Spanish Athletics Championships
Spanish Championships
Athletics Championships
Sport in Pamplona